Dilbert Isaac is a Papua New Guinea international rugby league footballer who plays as a  for the Papua New Guinea Hunters in the Queensland Cup.

Career
Isaac made his international debut for Papua New Guinea in their 24-14 victory over Fiji in the 2022 Pacific Test.

References

External links
PNG Hunters profile

1993 births
Living people
Papua New Guinea Hunters players
Papua New Guinea national rugby league team players
Papua New Guinean rugby league players
Rugby league props